Murdinskaya is a rural locality (a village) in Verkhneshardengskoye Rural Settlement, Velikoustyugsky District, Vologda Oblast, Russia. The population was 16 as of 2002.

Geography 
Murdinskaya is located 47 km south of Veliky Ustyug (the district's administrative centre) by road. Slobodchikovo is the nearest rural locality.

References 

Rural localities in Velikoustyugsky District